Narwee railway station is located on the East Hills line, serving the Sydney suburb of Narwee. It is served by Sydney Trains T8 Airport & South line services.

History
Narwee station opened on 21 December 1931 when the line was extended from Kingsgrove to East Hills. The line was through the station was duplicated in 1948.

In 2013, as part of the quadruplication of the line from Kingsgrove to Revesby, through lines were added on either side of the existing pair.

Upgrades
In September 2011, the bus stops and car park around the station were upgraded. In November 2014, scoping began for a further upgrade. The upgrade, which includes a new wheelchair-accessible lift and a new family-accessible toilet, was completed in December 2017.

Platforms & services

Transport links
Punchbowl Bus Company operates three routes via Narwee station:
940: Hurstville station to Bankstown station
941: Hurstville station to Bankstown station
944: Mortdale station to Bankstown station

Narwee station is served by one NightRide route:
N20: Riverwood station to Town Hall station

References

External links

Narwee station details Transport for New South Wales

Easy Access railway stations in Sydney
Railway stations in Sydney
Railway stations in Australia opened in 1931
Georges River Council
East Hills railway line